Elmsted is a village and civil parish in the Folkestone and Hythe District of Kent, England. It is located west of Stone Street (the B2068), the Roman road which today takes traffic between Canterbury and Lympne. Within the parish are the settlements of Bodsham, North Leigh and Evington. There are six elected members of the Parish Council.

The parish's name, Elmsted, is formed of two words. Elm refers to the large number of Elm trees that grew there in Saxon times. The second part, sted, comes from the Saxon word stede meaning 'place'.

Geography 
Elmsted is a small parish encompassing an area of approximately 10 km square with its population scattered in small hamlets like Bodsham, North Leigh and Elmsted Court. Settlements are largely at the top of the chalky down land with surrounding, lowland areas being used for grazing Cattle and Sheep and other farming . In these lower areas the ground contains far more in the way of clay and flint deposits than chalk. The Parish church of St James the Great lies in the center of the parish at a kilometer or two from the parish boundary in every direction. On its eastern boundary the parish largely follows parallel to the Roman Road Stone Street. However it dips into the hamlets of Stelling Minnis and into Sixmile cottages. The parish itself is 11 kilometers east of Ashford which is the nearest town.

The settlements in the parish are very scattered which can largely be attributed to the agricultural nature of the parish. Homesteads would be built next to the land that the people living in them farmed. The laborers on the farms would then walk to their parish church. The parish boundaries have remained broadly consistent with only slight variations in the south-east of the parish.    

The parish contains no shops or doctors surgery but does have a primary school, a pub, a cidery and a number of bed-and-breakfasts. The local school is Bodsham Church of England Primary School. The School has around 90 students and has a close link to the local church with a daily worship. It is part of the Federation of Church of England Primary Schools.

History 
The Roman road Stone Street defines part of the parish's eastern border. Constructed after the 43 AD invasion of the British Isles, the road was made to make travel from Canterbury to the south coast faster and more direct for movements of troops in the Empire. It also made trade for areas surrounding the road easier and later allowed the Archbishop of Canterbury to more easily monitor his diocese.

Elmsted was not named in the Domesday book but Bodsham, one of the hamlets in the parish was noted. This Is where the local school is situated today.

One of the more prominent families in the parish's history were the Honywoods who lived at Evington from the 1400s until the 1900s. Signs of this can be seen in St James the Great Church where the south chapel is known as the Honywood Chapel.

John Marius Wilson, of the Imperial Gazetteer of England and Wales gave the following description of the parish between 1870 and 1872"ELMSTEAD, a parish in Elham district, Kent; 4½ miles ESE of Wye r. station, and 6½ ENE of Ashford. It has a post office under Ashford, and a fair on 25 July. Acres, 2, 692. Real property, £2, 692. Pop., 492. Houses, 93. The property is divided among a few. The living is a vicarage in the diocese of Canterbury. Value, £80. Patron, the Archbishop of Canterbury. The church is old but good."Today the church is still under the Archbishop of Canterbury and whilst the church is now older it remains in good condition. The fair on the 25th of July for St James day now no longer takes place, though a spring fair occurs May 1 in Evington Hall. The number of houses in Elmsted has increased significantly in the last 110 years. As of the 2011 census there were 140 houses, an increase of 59 since 1901.

St James the Great 
The Anglican church is dedicated to St James the Great and dates back to the 11th century. It was restored in 1877 by Ewan Christian. It was Grade I listed in 1966 due to its historic and architectural significance. The church has an unusual wooden medieval belfry on the tower which was constructed across the 13th and 14th centuries. There are 6 bells in the church which were cast in 1721 by John Waylet. Before this there were 4 bells in the belfry which were recorded in 1552.  Much like other churches in the area its walls have been constructed with local flints. It is made up of a tower in the west, a nave with north and south aisles and a chancel with north and south chapels, all of which are open making the church open and airy.  There are a number of large tablets inside the church which are all dedicated to prominent families in the parish like the Honywoods. The church hosts a 19th-century organ as well as kitchen facilities, a toilet and a vestry which is now used for Sunday school. Every second Sunday of the month a family service is held in the church.

The two chapels were both added to the Church around 1300. the South Chapel is known as both a Chapel of John the Baptist and as the Honywood Chapel, the latter because of the monuments to Sir Thomas Honywood and Sir William Honywood as well as a number of dedications to the family on monuments on the walls and ledgers on the floor. In the 1877 restoration the family also paid for a new roof for the chapel.

Demographics 
Elmsted was featured in the 1881 census which provides information on the occupational structure of the population at the time. The majority of men and women worked in agriculture which reflects the rural nature of the small parish. The second largest group at that time were those working in domestic service or in offices. It is made up largely by women who were working at home whilst others living in the house would go out and work. Notably only 1 women was recorded as working in agriculture which shows how the industry was male dominated at the time.

After the mid 19th Century the village began a steady decrease in population from its peak in 1850 of just over 500 people to just over 250 in 1960. It has since risen somewhat back up to  just under 300 people.

In 2011 according to the census data there were 156 females and 163 males living in the parish. In that same year the population was largely made up of people between 35 and 64 suggesting that there are a large number of people who commute out of, Elmsted where there are very few employers, to towns nearby. Though it is notable that in Elmsted 25.7% of economically active 16 to 74 year olds are self-employed. This is far higher than the average for England which is only 9.8%. This may be linked to the bed and breakfasts, brewery and farms which are so common in the parish which provide full-time self-employment for many residents of the parish.

References

External links

Civil parishes in Kent
Villages in Kent
Folkestone and Hythe District